Frederick Waterson (1877 – 12 October 1918) was an English professional footballer who made over 160 appearances in the Football League for Burton Swifts and Burton United as a right half. After his retirement as a player, he served Doncaster Rovers as reserve team trainer.

Personal life 
After his retirement from league football, Waterson worked at Doncaster Works. During the First World War he enlisted in the King's Own (Yorkshire Light Infantry). He subsequently transferred to the Durham Light Infantry and was serving as a corporal when he was wounded on the Western Front during the Hundred Days Offensive in October 1918. Waterson died of his wounds on 12 October 1918, at a Casualty Clearing Station near Hazebrouck, France. His death occurred just under a month before the Armistice. He was buried in La Kreule Military Cemetery, near Hazebrouck.

Career statistics

References

1877 births
Sportspeople from Burton upon Trent
English footballers
Association football wing halves
Association football forwards
Fulham F.C. players
English Football League players
British Army personnel of World War I
King's Own Yorkshire Light Infantry soldiers
1918 deaths
Durham Light Infantry soldiers
Burton Swifts F.C. players
Burton United F.C. players
Doncaster Rovers F.C. players
British military personnel killed in World War I
Midland Football League players
Doncaster Rovers F.C. non-playing staff